Dhannur also spelled as Dhannooru is a village in the Hungund taluk of Bagalkot district in the Indian state of Karnataka.

Dhannur lies between Hungund and Muddebihal. Dhannur located on the banks of krishna river.

Demographics
As of 2001 India census, Dhannur had a population of 2,732 with 1,426 males and 1,306 females and 399 Households.

See also
Dammooru, Hunagunda
Kudalasangama
Badami
Hungund
Bagalkot
Karnataka

References

Villages in Bagalkot district